The Botswana women's national basketball team is administered by the Botswana Basketball Association (BBA).

It participated at the AfroBasket Women 2015 qualification round.

See also
 Botswana women's national under-19 basketball team
 Botswana women's national under-17 basketball team
 Botswana women's national 3x3 team
 Botswana men's national basketball team

References

External links
Botswana basketball at afrobasket.com
Botswana Basketball Association (BBA) at facebook.com

 
Women's national basketball teams
Women's national basketball teams in Africa